Curtis J. Milhaupt is professor of law at Stanford Law School. From 1999 until January 2018, he was the Parker Professor of Comparative Corporate Law, Fuyo Professor of Japanese Law, and the director of the Center for Japanese Legal Studies at Columbia Law School. He is a leading authority on comparative corporate governance, law and economic development, and the legal systems of East Asia. He is a member of the American Law Institute.

Prof. Milhaupt testified before Congress on February 15, 2012, on national security implications of the bilateral trade and economic relations between the U.S. and the People's Republic of China.

Education
B.A., University of Notre Dame 1984
J.D., Columbia Law School 1989

College and University positions
 Professor of Law, Stanford Law School, January, 2018–present
Director, Center for Japanese Legal Studies, Columbia Law School, 1999–2017.
Appointed the 2008 Albert E. Cinelli Enterprise Professor of Law in recognition of his innovative teaching in the field of business law at Columbia Law School.
Erasmus Mundus Fellow in Law and Economics at the University of Bologna, appointed by the European Commission, Summer 2008.
Paul Hastings Visiting Professor in Corporate and Financial Law at The University of Hong Kong, May 2007.
Visiting Professor of Law at Tsinghua University in Beijing, Fall 2006.
Research Fellow at the Research Institute of Economy, Trade and Industry, Tokyo, Fall 2002.
Professor of Law, Washington University School of Law, 1994–1999.

References

External links
 Curtis J. Milhaupt at Columbia Law School
 University of Chicago Press book: Law and Capitalism

Columbia Law School alumni
Columbia Law School faculty
University of Notre Dame alumni
Living people
Year of birth missing (living people)
Washington University in St. Louis faculty
Academic staff of Tsinghua University
Academic staff of the University of Hong Kong
Academic staff of the University of Bologna
Stanford Law School faculty